Robert Whymant (29 November 1944 – 26 December 2004) was a British writer and reporter. During his time as reporter he worked for The Guardian, The Times and The Daily Telegraph.

Biography
Whymant was born in Luton. Later he went to Cambridge University, where he studied oriental languages. He later moved to Japan and in 1972 he started to write for the major newspapers. He also wrote for newspapers in Australia and lectured at Waseda University in Tokyo.

In 1996 Whymant wrote a book about German spy Richard Sorge, Stalin’s Spy: Richard Sorge and the Tokyo Ring. He spent 20 years researching Sorge before he wrote the book.

Death
Whymant drowned while on holiday in Sri Lanka after being washed away by the tsunami on 26 December 2004, aged 60.

References

External links
The Times - Obituary
The Guardian - Obituary

1944 births
2004 deaths
English writers
Victims of the 2004 Indian Ocean earthquake and tsunami
English reporters and correspondents
Natural disaster deaths in Sri Lanka
People from Luton
Alumni of the University of Cambridge
British expatriates in Japan
Academic staff of Waseda University